Marcelo Osvaldo Magnasco is a biophysicist and a professor at The Rockefeller University.

He is known for his work on  thermal ratchets as models of biological motors, auditory biophysics, bailout embeddings, neural coding, other studies of biological networks such as leaf venation, and for placing the date of the solar eclipse mentioned in the Odyssey on April 16, 1178 B.C. together with Constantino Baikouzis of the National University of La Plata.

In 2013, Magnasco formed the m2c2 collaboration with cetacean researcher Diana Reiss in order to study marine mammal communication and cognition. Their interdisciplinary team is probing dolphin intelligence using an underwater interactive touchpad at the National Aquarium (Baltimore).

References

External links 
 Home Page at Rockefeller University 
 Lewis Clark Vanexum Lecture at Princeton on Homer's Eclipse 
 BigThink interview 

1963 births
Argentine biophysicists
Argentine expatriates in the United States
Argentine people of Italian descent
Argentine physicists
Living people
Rockefeller University faculty
University of Chicago alumni